The 1895 Philadelphia mayoral election saw the election Charles F. Warwick, who defeated then-Pennsylvania Governor Robert E. Pattison.

Results

References

1895
Philadelphia
Philadelphia mayoral
19th century in Philadelphia